{{Automatic Taxobox
| name = Scelidotherium
| fossil_range = Pleistocene (Lujanian)~
| image = Scelidotherium leptocephalum side.jpg
| image_caption = S. leptocephalumSkeletal mount in the National Museum of Natural History (France)
| taxon = Scelidotherium
| authority = Owen, 1840
| subdivision_ranks = Species
| subdivision = 
 †S. australis
 †S. bravardi
 †S. elegans
 †S. laevidens
 †S. leptocephalum Owen 1840
 †S. modicum
 †S. parodii Kraglievich 1923
 †S. patrium
 †S. pozzii
 †S. reyesi
 †S. tarijense
}}Scelidotherium is an extinct genus of ground sloth of the family Scelidotheriidae, endemic to South America during the Late Pleistocene epoch.

 Description 
It is characterized by an elongated, superficially anteater-like head. In fossil distribution, it is known from Argentina (Luján and Arroyo Seco Formations), Bolivia (Tarija Formation), Peru (San Sebastián Formation), Panama, Brazil, Paraguay and Ecuador.

In his journal of The Voyage of the Beagle, Charles Darwin reports the finding of a nearly perfect fossil Scelidotherium in Punta Alta while travelling overland from Bahía Blanca to Buenos Aires in 1832. He allied it to the Megatherium. Owen (1840) recognized the true characters of the remains and named them Scelidotherium, which means "femur beast" to reflect the distinctive proportions of that skeletal element.

 Taxonomy Scelidotherium was named by Owen (1840). It was assigned to Mylodontidae by Carroll (1988); and to Scelidotheriinae by Gaudin (1995) and Zurita et al. (2004). Scelidotheriinae was elevated back to full family status by Presslee et al.'' (2019).

Gallery

References

Further reading 
 Owen, R. (1840) Zoology of the Voyage of the Beagle1, Fossil Mammalia.

Prehistoric sloths
Prehistoric placental genera
Pleistocene xenarthrans
Pleistocene mammals of South America
Lujanian
Pleistocene Argentina
Fossils of Argentina
Pleistocene Bolivia
Fossils of Bolivia
Pleistocene Brazil
Fossils of Brazil
Pleistocene Ecuador
Fossils of Ecuador
Pleistocene Panama
Fossils of Panama
Pleistocene Paraguay
Fossils of Paraguay
Pleistocene Peru
Fossils of Peru
Fossil taxa described in 1840
Taxa named by Richard Owen